In Greek mythology, the name Evaechme, Euaechme or Euaichme (Ancient Greek: Εὐαίχμη) may refer to:

Evaechme, a Megarian princess as daughter of King Megareus and Iphinoe, daughter of King Nisus, thus sister of Evippus and Timalcus. She was the second wife of Alcathous, son of Pelops and by him, became the mother of Ischepolis, Callipolis, Iphinoe and Periboea. Otherwise, the mother of these children was Pyrgo.
Evaechme, daughter of Hyllus and Iole, wife of Polycaon, the son of the Argonaut Butes.

Notes

References 

 Pausanias, Description of Greece with an English Translation by W.H.S. Jones, Litt.D., and H.A. Ormerod, M.A., in 4 Volumes. Cambridge, MA, Harvard University Press; London, William Heinemann Ltd. 1918. . Online version at the Perseus Digital Library
 Pausanias, Graeciae Descriptio. 3 vols. Leipzig, Teubner. 1903.  Greek text available at the Perseus Digital Library.

Heracleidae
Women in Greek mythology
Megarian characters in Greek mythology